is a "versus" superhero film in the Super Sentai Series long-standing tradition of crossover films known collectively as the "VS Series". The film, released on January 22, 2011, features a meeting of the casts and characters of Tensou Sentai Goseiger and Samurai Sentai Shinkenger. The heroes of Kaizoku Sentai Gokaiger also make a cameo appearance in the film, their cameo explained in their show's 40th episode. The film was first announced on Toei's Twitter feed on October 21, 2010. This is the first Super Sentai VS entry released on Blu-ray, which was out on March 21, 2011, along with the DVD. The movie takes place between epics 32 and 33 with the events taking place on October 2, 2010.

Plot
While running some errands for his fellow Goseigers and Nozomu, Alata finds himself fighting the Nanashi Company and the Ayakashi Madokodama before he receives aid from Shinken Red. However, the fight is witnessed by a mysterious figure as Madokodama falls back. Thinking that Doukoku Chimatsuri has somehow returned, Takeru leaves to recall his vassals while accepting the Goseigers' help. Setting up base in the Amachi Institute against his wishes, Takeru introduces Hikoma Kusakabe to the Goseigers as they learn of the Gedoushu. Ryunosuke Ikenami is the first Shinkenger to arrive before the Gedoushu resume their attack. Using Bibi Soldiers to hold off the two Shinkengers, Madokodama attacks the Goseigers as Shinken Green arrives. However, the leader of the Gedoshu arrives - revealed not to be Doukoku, but Buredoran.

As Alata tries to convince Ryunosuke and Chiaki to help them, Eri and Agri pick up Mako Shiraishi while Hyde and Moune meet up with Kotoha Hanaori before their reunion is interrupted by Takeru, who has become possessed by Buredoran. Their initial happiness at seeing their lord turns into disbelief as they watch him transform into Gedou Shinken Red and attack the Goseigers before aiming his Rekka Daizantou at his vassals. However, Gosei Red takes the death blow meant for them before Gosei Knight and Shinken Gold arrive to cover their escape. While Alata's wounds are tended, Gosei Knight suggests to the other Goseigers to augment their Tensou Techniques, as Madokodama has the ability to absorb and return their attacks. Seeing Gosei Red's selfless heroism in battle, the Shinkengers agree to ally themselves with the Goseigers. The next day, the teams learn to combine their Tensou Technique and Modikara abilities (Eri and Mako with air, Ryunoske and Hyde with water, Chiaki and Moune for their affinity with plants, and Agri and Kotoha with their geokinetic powers) and manage to succeed as Alata comes to and assures Ryunosuke that everything would work out. Meanwhile, Kaoru Shiba arrives at the Shiba base, certain that she has a solution to the crisis. By then, as Buredoran's plan to drown the Gosei World with the Sanzu River's waters is revealed to Shitari's shock, the Goseigers and Shinkengers arrive to stop it only to be forced to fight Gedou Shinken Red until Gosei Red arrives and uses a Modikara-powered Flametornado Card to free Shinken Red from Buredoran's hold. The two Sentai teams proceed to fight their way through the Bibis and Nanashi.

As the others use their Tensou Technique/Modikara combos to overpower Madokodama, Super Gosei Red and Hyper Shinken Red manage to defeat phantoms of Buredoran's Warstar and Yuumajuu guises before regrouping with the others to finish off both monsters' first forms with the Super Shinkengers and a Miracle Gosei/Knight Dynamic combo. Meanwhile, on the other side of the field, a lost DaiGoyou spots a Gedoushu army led by Shitari, who plans an attack on Buredoran's forces in an attempt to regain the Sanzu River. However, just before he can attack Buredoran and much to DaiGoyou's shock, Shitari and his accompanying army are suddenly ambushed and subsequently decimated by an arriving force that claims to be the 35th Super Sentai, Kaizoku Sentai Gokaiger. After the army's destruction, and before they take their leave, the Gokaigers ask DaiGoyou not to mention them to anyone. Though the two Sentai teams manage to stop the river's flow into the Gosei World, they battle an enlarged Buredoran and Madokodama in Ground Gosei Great and DaiKai ShinkenOh with DaiGoyou and Datas Hyper providing backup. Though Madokodama is destroyed, Buredoran survives and attempts to destroy the robots with his signature attack. With the Shinkengers' encouragement, the Goseigers form Ground Hyper Gosei Great and manage to take down Buredoran with Modikara Headder Strike. Later, the two teams part ways as the Goseigers head back home and Alata suggests that they try living as samurai, much to the others' disapproval.

Cast
 Alata/Gosei Red: Yudai Chiba
 Eri/Gosei Pink: Rika Sato
 Agri/Gosei Black: Kyousuke Hamao
 Moune/Gosei Yellow: Mikiho Niwa
 Hyde/Gosei Blue: Kento Ono
 Nozomu Amachi: Sakuya Nakamura
 Professor Shuichiro Amachi: Louis Yamada LIII
 Gosei Knight: Katsuyuki Konishi (Voice)
 Datas: Kōki Miyata
 Buredoran: Nobuo Tobita
 Tensouder Voice: Ikuya Sawaki
 Takeru Shiba/Shinken Red: Tori Matsuzaka
 Ryunosuke Ikenami/Shinken Blue: Hiroki Aiba
 Mako Shiraishi/Shinken Pink: Rin Takanashi
 Chiaki Tani/Shinken Green: Shogo Suzuki
 Kotoha Hanaori/Shinken Yellow: Suzuka Morita
 Genta Umemori/Shinken Gold: Keisuke Sohma
 Kaoru Shiba: Runa Natsui
 Hikoma Kusakabe: Goro Ibuki
 DaiGoyou: Kōichi Tōchika (Voice)
 Shitari of the Bones: Chō (Voice)
 Madokodama: Tesshō Genda (Voice)
 Gokai Red (Captain Marvelous): Ryota Ozawa (Voice)
 Gokai Blue (Joe Gibken): Yuki Yamada (Voice)
 Gokai Yellow (Luka Millfy): Mao Ichimichi (Voice)
 Gokai Green (Don "Doc" Dogoier): Kazuki Shimizu (Voice)
 Gokai Pink (Ahim de Famille): Yui Koike (Voice)
 Mobirates Voice: Tomokazu Seki

Theme song

Lyrics: Shoko Fujibayashi
Composition: Takafumi Iwasaki
Arrangement: Project.R (Kenichiro Ōishi)
Artist: Hideyuki Takahashi

References

External links
Official website 
Toei Video website 

2011 films
2010s Super Sentai films
Crossover tokusatsu films
Films about angels
Samurai films
Japanese supernatural films